Nenjai Thodu is a 2007 Indian Tamil-language film  starring newcomer Gemini and Lakshmi Rai. The film was produced by NRIs.

Plot
The movie starts off with the Nasser losing his wife at the birth of his second son. He starts to hate his son and even leaves home with his first child. The child grows up into Siva  and he lives with his grandparents who love him so much.

Siva's brother's Krishna marriage gets fixed up. At this time, Siva meets his father again. His father still hates him and barely talks to him. This really hurts Siva. He tries to not keep it in his mind and just goes along. At this point he meets Aishwarya, who is his brother's sister-in-law. These two lock horns with each other right in their first meeting.

As time goes by, Siva and Aishwarya develop feeling towards each other. At the same point, his father also starts to like him. Unfortunately, Siva's marriage gets fixed up with another girl, chosen by his father. Now, Siva is scared to tell his father, that he loves Aishwarya, because he doesn't want to break his father's trust in him. Siva's grandfather knows about the love between Siva and Aishwarya and even tries to convince his son to get them both married, but Nasser refuses. Now, Siva is stuck between his father and his love. But fate has some other games to play.

When both Siva and Aishwarya were travelling in a train, they come to know that bomb is fixed in a train. All the passengers had come out, the train gets crashed which makes Siva think that Aishwarya is dead while Aishwarya assumes that Siva is dead, they both fall unconscious and admitted to the hospital. It is revealed that Siva's mind has damaged (doctor reveals that since his mother died his mind has become emotional) and he is under the wrong impression that Aiswarya is dead. The film ends with Siva's father and Aishwarya taking care of Siva but it is revealed that Siva's mind will become normal only after four or five months.

Cast 
Gemini as Siva 
Lakshmi Rai as Aishwarya
Nagesh as  Siva's grandfather
Nassar
M Thoufeeq as Krishna

Production
The film's director Rajkannan earlier assisted K. Bhagyaraj.

Songs
Soundtrack was composed by Srikanth Deva. Lyrics by Viveka and M.G. Kaniappan.
 "Puthu Vasam" - Hariharan, Sadhana Sargam
 "Kichu Kichu" - Sangeetha
 "En Thai Aval" - Vijay Yesudas
 "LKG" - Malgudi Subha
 "Thondathe" - Shankar Mahadevan, Anuradha Sriram
 "Ulalela" - Udit Narayan, Srilekha Parthasarathy

References

2007 films
2000s Tamil-language films
Films scored by Srikanth Deva